Horacio Podestá (26 July 1911 – 15 July 1999) was an Argentine rower who competed in the 1936 Summer Olympics.

In 1936 he won the bronze medal with his partner Julio Curatella in the coxless pairs competition.

External links
 profile

1911 births
1999 deaths
Argentine male rowers
Olympic rowers of Argentina
Rowers at the 1936 Summer Olympics
Olympic bronze medalists for Argentina
Olympic medalists in rowing
Medalists at the 1936 Summer Olympics